Martin Železník (born 9 November 1989) is a Slovak football midfielder who is free agent.

References

External links
at spartak.sk 

1989 births
Living people
Slovak footballers
Association football midfielders
FC Spartak Trnava players
Slovak Super Liga players
ŠK Senec players